Staring to the Sun is a single and an extended play (EP) by American noise pop band Scarling. It was released on June 6, 2006. "Staring to the Sun" seems to be a sister song to So Long, Scarecrow's title track as the two songs share multiple lines of lyrics.

Aside from the title track, the single came with two B-sides; "City Noise", taken from their previous album So Long, Scarecrow and a cover of Pixies' "Wave of Mutilation".

Track listing
"City Noise"
"Staring to the Sun"
"Wave of Mutilation"

Personnel
Jessicka – vocals
Christian Hejnal – guitar, vocals, bass
Rickey Lime – guitar
 Beth Gordon – drums
Rob Campanella – producer
Piper Ferguson – cover photography

Review
Allmusic  [ link]

References

2006 singles
Scarling. songs
Sympathy for the Record Industry singles